Abdelhamid Halim Ben Mabrouk (born June 25, 1960) is a retired Algerian footballer who played as a midfielder. He spent his career in France and played for Algeria, most notably at the 1986 FIFA World Cup.

External links
 

Living people
1960 births
Footballers from Lyon
Association football midfielders
French footballers
Algerian footballers
French sportspeople of Algerian descent
Racing Club de France Football players
FC Girondins de Bordeaux players
Olympique Lyonnais players
Ligue 1 players
Ligue 2 players
1986 FIFA World Cup players
Algeria international footballers